The second series of Polish television music competition X Factor started on TVN on 3 March and will end in June 2012. The pre-auditions took place in December 2011 and filmed auditions began on 10 January 2012 in Zabrze. Two of the judges, Czesław Mozil and Kuba Wojewódzki returned, though Maja Sablewska had left the show after the first series. She was replaced by a new judge, Tatiana Okupnik. Jarosław Kuźniar returned to present the show.

Judges and presenter

The judging panel line-up for the second series of X Factor was revealed on 5 January 2012. Kuba Wojewódzki and Czesław Mozil returned for the show and were joined by new judge, Tatiana Okupnik, who replaced Maja Sablewska.

In December 2012, media reported that Maja Sablewska would not return and would be replaced by a female singer. Monika Brodka, Ewa Farna and Tatiana Okupnik were said to be in the running for the job.

In October 2011, Adam Darski, better known by his stage name Nergal, was rumoured to join X Factor judging panel.  He was a judge on the first series of The Voice of Poland, but was expected not to return for the next year due to the controversy caused by his appearance on the show. Darski was accused of spreading satanism by his behaviour on stage. That was why many catholic organisations wanted the public Polish Television (TVP) which broadcasts the show, to fire him. His contract with TVP expired after the final of the series in December 2011.

In November 2011, Fakt reported that Natalia Kukulska might join the judging panel, replacing Maja Sablewska. Kukulska was already rumoured as judge on the first series of X Factor in late 2010, but the network decided to hire Sablewska. According to some reports, Kukulska was interested in the judging role on the show.

On 8 November 2011, Fakt reported that Edyta Górniak was one of the favourites to become the permanent judge or only appear at the judges' houses stage of the show. Few days later, in an interview with Plejada she confirmed that she had been offered a judging role on X Factor and its rival show, Bitwa na głosy. She revealed that she was considering both offers, but not as seriously as media reports. She also added that she wanted to focus on her upcoming concerts and might not have enough time to serve as a judge. Later, Górniak was announced as the new coach on Bitwa na głosy.

On 21 November 2011, it was officially confirmed by TVN that Jarosław Kuźniar would return to present the second series of X Factor.

Selection process

Applications and auditions
The pre-auditions took place in December 2011 in four Polish cities: Gdańsk, Wrocław, Zabrze and Warsaw. These featured auditionees performing in front of the producers only, without judges' participation yet. The filming started with the judges' auditions, which began on 10 January 2012 in Zabrze. These also continued on 11 and 12 January.  The second part of Zabrze auditions took place on 25, 26 and 27 January.

Bootcamp
Bootcamp took place on 31 January and 1 February in Warsaw. The episode was broadcast on 7 April 2012.

The fifteen chosen acts were:
16-24s - Anna Antonik, Ewelina Lisowska, Bożena Mazur, Dawid Podsiadło, Klaudia Szafrańska
Over 25s - Paweł 'Biba' Binkiewicz, Thomas Grotto, Joanna Kwaśnik, Izabela Mytnik, Marcin Spenner
Groups - Che Donne, De Facto, Okay, Soul City, The Chance

Judges' houses 
Tatiana Okupnik was joined by Verona Chard, who helped her to choose her final three acts. Kuba Wojewódzki invited Leszek Możdzer. Czesław Mozil was aided by Ewa Farna.

The six eliminated acts were:
 16-24s: Klaudia Szafrańska, Bożena Mazur
 Over-25s: Izabela Mytnik, Thomas Grotto
 Groups: Che Donne, Okay

Contestants
The top 9 contestants were confirmed as follows:

Key:
 – Winner
 – Runner up
 – Third Place

Live shows

Results summary
Contestants' colour key:
{|
|-
| – Kuba Wojewódzki's contestants (over 25s)
|-
| – Tatiana Okupnik's contestants (16–24s)
|-
| – Czesław Mozil's contestants (groups)
|}

Wojewódzki was not required to vote as there was already a majority.

Live show details

Week 1 (21 April)
Theme: Songs chosen by the contestants

Judges' votes to save
 Wojewódzki: De Facto
 Okupnik: The Chance
 Mozil: The Chance

Week 2 (28 April)
Theme: Disco

Judges' votes to save
 Mozil: Joanna Kwaśnik
 Okupnik: Joanna Kwaśnik
 Wojewódzki: not required to vote as there was already a majority

Week 3 (5 May)
Theme: Musical Giants

Judges' votes to save
 Mozil: The Chance - backed his own act
 Okupnik: Anna Antonik - backed her own act
 Wojewódzki: The Chance - stated he couldn't imagine the show without this group, but said a lot of good words about Antonik

Week 4 (12 May)
Theme: Songs from films
Group performance: "It's Raining Men"

Judges' votes to save
 Mozil: Soul City
 Wojewódzki: Joanna Kwaśnik
 Okupnik: Soul City

Week 5 (19 May)
Themes: Big band, Polish songs

Judges' votes to save
 Wojewódzki: Soul City
 Okupnik: The Chance
 Mozil: The Chance

Week 6: Semi-final (26 May)
Themes: Songs chosen by mentors; songs by Adele

Judges' votes to save
 Mozil: The Chance
 Okupnik: Ewelina Lisowska
 Wojewódzki: The Chance

Week 7: Final (2 June)
Themes: No theme (songs the mentor and contestants believe will get them through the final); celebrity duets
Celebrity duet performers:
Katie Melua with Dawid Podsiadło
Amy Macdonald with The Chance
Brainstorm with Marcin Spenner
Celebrity performers: Tatiana Okupnik (vocal), Czesław Mozil (accordion), Kuba Wojewódzki (percussion) ("Fever")

Ratings

References

External links
X Factor

X Factor (Polish TV series)
2012 Polish television seasons
Poland 02